Samuel Richard Coffman (December 18, 1906 – March 24, 1972) was an American Major League Baseball pitcher with the Washington Senators, St. Louis Browns, New York Giants, Boston Bees and Philadelphia Phillies between 1927 and 1945. Coffman batted and threw right-handed. He was born in Veto, Alabama. Coffman's brother, Slick, also pitched in the major leagues.

Career
In a 15-season career, Coffman posted a 72–95 record with a 4.65 ERA and 38 saves in 472 appearances (132 as a starter). In 1938, he led the National League in appearances (51), saves (12) and games finished (35). His only ejection in Major League Baseball (MLB) came on August 15, 1934, when he was ejected by homeplate umpire Harry Geisel for arguing balls and strikes.

Death
Coffman died in Athens, Alabama, at the age of 65.

See also
 List of Major League Baseball annual saves leaders

References

Sources

Dick Coffman - Baseballbiography.com

1906 births
1972 deaths
People from Athens, Alabama
Boston Braves players
New York Giants (NL) players
Philadelphia Phillies players
St. Louis Browns players
Washington Senators (1901–1960) players
Major League Baseball pitchers
Baseball players from Alabama
Minor league baseball managers
Quincy Red Birds players
Chattanooga Lookouts players
Birmingham Barons players
Jersey City Skeeters players
Milwaukee Brewers (minor league) players
New Orleans Pelicans (baseball) players
St. Paul Saints (AA) players
Knoxville Smokies players
Syracuse Chiefs players